A tower restaurant is a restaurant located in a tower and is accessible by an elevator.

Tower restaurants are laid out in such a way that guests can enjoy the panorama when taking their meal and beverages. Numerous tower restaurants are revolving restaurants, continuously rotating around the tower axle with the help of a drive.

Austria
Donauturm, Wien (Revolving restaurant)

In Austria the Danube tower two tower restaurants are implemented as revolving restaurants, as well as the Bergiselschanze at the jump tower.

Australia
Alto Tower Restaurant, Telstra Tower, Canberra
360 Bar And Dining, Sydney Tower, Sydney
Summit, Australia Square, Sydney

Canada
Sky 360, Calgary Tower, Calgary
360 Restaurant, CN Tower, Toronto

Germany
 Water Tower Belvedere (Revolving restaurant) (closed at the moment)
 Bierpinsel, Berlin
 Radio Tower Berlin, Berlin
 Berliner Fernsehturm, Berlin (Revolving restaurant)
 Florianturm, Dortmund (Revolving restaurant)
 Fernsehturm Dresden-Wachwitz, Dresden (closed at the moment)
 Fair Tower Cologne
 Colonius, Cologne
 Fernsehturm Schwerin-Zippendorf, Schwerin
 Fernmeldeturm Nürnberg, Nuremberg (closed at the moment)
 Europaturm, Frankfurt (closed at the moment)
 Fernsehturm Kulpenburg (closed at the moment)
 Gauss Tower, Dransfeld
 Rheinturm, Düsseldorf (Revolving restaurant)
 Henninger Turm, Frankfurt am Main (2 revolving restaurants, closed at the moment)
 Heinrich-Hertz-Turm, Hamburg (Revolving restaurant, closed at the moment)
 Jen-Tower, Jena
 Main Tower, Frankfurt am Main (Revolving restaurant) 
 Fernmeldeturm, Mannheim (Revolving restaurant)
 Olympiaturm, München (Revolving restaurant)
 Goldbergturm, Sindelfingen
 Fernsehturm Stuttgart, Stuttgart
 Longinus Tower, Nottuln
 Hünenburg Observation Tower, Bielefeld

United States
Carnelian Room, 555 California Street, San Francisco (closed 2009)
Top of the World, Las Vegas
Terrace on the Park, New York City
Windows on the World, New York City, destroyed in terrorist attack
The View, New York City (revolving restaurant)
SkyCity at the Space Needle, Seattle (revolving restaurant)

Elsewhere
Many countries have tower restaurants on large towers that attract visitors, including the TV tower Näsinneula in Tampere, the Eiffel Tower in Paris, the Kaknaes Tower in Stockholm, the Ostankino Tower and Baghdad Tower. A tower restaurant can be accommodated on other structures for example the suspension tower of the new Danube bridge Bratislava with restaurant at 84.6 meters height.

Restaurants by type